The Pointe de l'Espiguette is a vast dune system located on the Mediterranean coast of the Gard department in France.

It is east of Le Grau-du-Roi and west of the Petit-Rhône, in the Petite Camargue region. The dune system is almost 18 kilometers (11 miles) long and stretches across several hectares. L'Espiguette is a preserved wild natural site, although it is fragile. The beaches at the location attract numerous tourists and swimmers each year. The Phare de l'Espiguette is located in the dune system.

See also 

 Phare de l'Espiguette
 Petite Camargue

References 

Dunes of France
Camargue
Landforms of Gard